New York Central Lines LLC was a limited liability company that owned railroad lines in the United States that are owned and operated by CSX Transportation. The company was formed in 1998 to own Conrail lines assigned to CSX in the split of Conrail between CSX and the Norfolk Southern Railway; operations were switched over on June 1, 1999. The company was named after the old New York Central Railroad, whose old main line became a line of the new company. In November 2003, the Surface Transportation Board approved a plan allowing CSX to fully absorb New York Central Lines, which was done on August 27, 2004.

List of lines

See also
List of CSX Transportation lines
Pennsylvania Lines LLC

References

Surface Transportation Board, Docket FD_33388_0, CSX Corporation and CSX Transportation, Inc., Norfolk Southern Corporation and Norfolk Southern Railway Company—control and operating leases/agreements—Conrail Inc. and Consolidated Rail Corporation, July 23, 1998
Conrail System Map Showing The Proposed Allocation Of Conrail Lines & Rights, July 9, 1997
CSX Transportation Timetables
Petition for Supplemental Order - detailing the absorption of New York Central Lines, LLC by CSX

Predecessors of CSX Transportation
New York Central Railroad
Conrail
Railway companies established in 1998
Railway companies disestablished in 2004